Szczęsne  is a village in the administrative district of Gmina Purda, within Olsztyn County, Warmian-Masurian Voivodeship, in northern Poland. It is located within the historic region of Warmia.

Before 1772 the area was part of Kingdom of Poland, from 1772 Prussia and after 1871 Germany (East Prussia), and after 1945 again Poland.

Four historic wayside shrines, typical for Warmia, are located within the village.

References

Villages in Olsztyn County